The Pampas de Ayacucho Historic Sanctuary is located near the town of Quinua in the region of Ayacucho. It has an area of 3 km2 and was established in 1980 to protect the site of  the Battle of Ayacucho.

References

External links

Historic sites in Peru
Protected areas established in 1980
Geography of Ayacucho Region